The 2010–2011 UCI Track Cycling World Cup Classics was a multi race tournament over a season of track cycling. The season ran from 2 December 2010 to 20 February 2011. The World Cup is organised by the Union Cycliste Internationale.

As in the previous season, the rounds were held in Melbourne (Australia), Cali (Colombia), Beijing (China) and Manchester (Great Britain) although there was a slight reshuffling with Manchester moving from the first round to the last.

In a change to the format of World Cup events, only the Olympic events (Keirin, Omnium, sprint, team sprint and team pursuit) were contested at each round. The other World Championships events were contested at one or two rounds only.

Overall team standings
Overall team standings are calculated based on total number of points gained by the team's riders in each event. The top ten teams after round 4 are listed below:

Results

Men

Women

See also

 2010–11 UCI Track Cycling World Ranking

References

External links
UCI events schedule

 
World Cup Classics
World Cup Classics
UCI Track Cycling World Cup